Commerce de Lyon was a  74-gun ship of the line of the French Navy.

Career 
Ordered on 29 September 1803, Commerce de Lyon was one of the ships built in the various shipyards captured by the First French Empire in Holland and Italy in a crash programme to replenish the ranks of the French Navy.

Commissioned under Commander Victor-André Hulot-Gury, she was part of Missiessy's squadron of the Escaut from 1810 to 1813. In March 1813, she was appointed to defend Antwerp.

After the Treaty of Paris in 1814, she was one of the 12 ships of the line France was authorised to keep, and she was sailed to Brest. Put in ordinary there, she was never reactivated; she was struck on 23 February 1819 and broken up in 1830.

Notes, citations, and references

Notes

Citations

References
 

Ships of the line of the French Navy
Téméraire-class ships of the line
1807 ships